Gremyachinsk is a town in Perm Krai, Russia, located  northeast of Perm, the administrative center of the krai. Population:

History
The emergence of the town in 1841 is connected with the mastering of the Gremyachinsky coal deposit. In 1942 when coal mining started the mining settlements on the territory of the deposit and station settlement Baskaya were united to form the settlement of urban-type Gremyachinsky and in 1949 the settlement was transformed to town. In those years a significant part of the town and its surroundings was made up of the recently released GULAG prisoners and "special settlers" (mostly German prisoners of war).

The further life of the town was connected with coal mining, Gremyachinsk shared the fate of other towns of decaying Kizelovsky coalfield. During the war years, the acute need for coal and the use of cheap labour made the development of the Gremyachinsky deposit profitable. Since the 1960s, coal production in the Kizelovsky basin became unprofitable and started to decrease. In the 1970s, the automobile parts plant and several other enterprises were built to keep the town busy which slowed the flow of population out of the town. With the closure of the last mines in the 1990s, Gremyachinsk became a village near a gas compressor station.

Administrative and municipal status
Within the framework of administrative divisions, it is, together with the work settlement of Usva and five rural localities, incorporated as the town of krai significance of Gremyachinsk—an administrative unit with the status equal to that of the districts. As a municipal division, the town of Gremyachinsk, together with two rural localities, is incorporated as Gremyachinskoye Urban Settlement within Gremyachinsky Municipal District and serves as the municipal district's administrative center, while the work settlement of Usva and the remaining three rural localities are grouped into three rural settlements within Gremyachinsky Municipal District.

See also
Zagotovka

References

Notes

Sources

External links
Official website of Gremyachinsk 
Gremyachinsk Business Directory  

Cities and towns in Perm Krai
Cities and towns built in the Soviet Union
Populated places established in 1942
1942 establishments in Russia